The 1880–81 season was Northwich Victoria's 7th season, however the club was not a member of an organised league and played only challenge matches organised on an ad hoc basis. The club won the Cheshire Senior Cup, then known as the Cheshire County Football Association Challenge Cup, for the second successive season. They also participated in the Welsh Cup for the third time, reaching the semi-final. The side was captained by Matthew Earlam for the 7th successive season. He was also the joint top goalscorer for the season with 8 goals.

First-team squad
This is the squad who won the Cheshire County Football Association Challenge Cup (Cheshire Senior Cup).

Notes
A. : Also the club's honorable secretary and treasurer.
B. : Also the club's joint honorable secretary.

References

See also
List of Northwich Victoria F.C. seasons

Northwich Victoria F.C. seasons
Northwich Victoria